Tongnan District is a district of Chongqing Municipality, China, bordering Sichuan province to the north and west.

Administration

Climate

References

Districts of Chongqing